Ruensley Anthony Leuteria (born 17 June 1992) is a football player from Curaçao, currently playing for the national football team of Curaçao. He debuted internationally in a friendly against Aruba in a 2–0 victory. In September 2018, he scored his goal against Grenada in a 10–0 victory.

International career

International goals
Scores and results list Curaçao's goal tally first.

References

External links
 https://www.national-football-teams.com/player/54170/Ruensly_Leuteria.html

1992 births
Living people
Curaçao international footballers
Association football midfielders
People from Willemstad
Curaçao footballers